Moshe Zabari (born 1935, in Jerusalem) is an Israeli artist known for his silver Judaica.

He studied under Ludwig Yehuda Wolpert and David Gumbel at the Bezalel Academy of Arts and Design in Jerusalem.

Zabari was artist-in-residence for almost three decades at New York's Jewish Museum.  He returned to his native Israel in the 1980s.  He is known for his modernist approach, a reviewer described his 1998 sculpture, "Death by Stoning," as "elegant and beautiful," despite describing a "terrible act of violence."

In 1990 he was awarded the Jesselson Prize for Contemporary Judaica Design.

In 2015 Zabari was honoured with a Retrospective at the Jerusalem Biennale.

Museum exhibitions
 Homecoming to the Holy Land: New Works by Moshe Zabari, Berman Museum of Art at Ursinus College, 1999.
 Homecoming to the Holy Land: New Work by Moshe Zabari, Skirball Museum, 1998.

References

Israeli male sculptors
1935 births
Living people
Bezalel Academy of Arts and Design alumni